Ernest Carter (24 February 1889 – 25 April 1955) was an Australian rules footballer who played with Richmond and Carlton in the Victorian Football League (VFL).

Notes

External links 

Ernest Carter's profile at Blueseum

1889 births
1955 deaths
Australian rules footballers from Victoria (Australia)
Richmond Football Club players
Carlton Football Club players